Erythrina burana is a species of legume in the family Fabaceae. It is found only in Ethiopia.

References

Sources 

burana
Flora of Ethiopia
Near threatened plants
Taxonomy articles created by Polbot